Heldalsmo is a village in Froland municipality in Agder county, Norway. The village is only accessible by rail from Hynnekleiv to the west or Nelaug to the east, or by the Norwegian County Road 152 which runs to the south through Jomås and on to Blakstad.

References

Villages in Agder
Froland